Cecil John White (1900 – March 1986), known under the pen name 'Unk' White, was an Australian cartoonist born in Auckland, New Zealand.

White came to Sydney in 1922 with the artists Joe and Guy Lynch and was soon immersed in the bohemian scene there.

He was a regular contributor to Australian magazines, notably Melbourne Punch and The Bulletin, also Smith's Weekly and Beckett's Budget.

White produced the comic strips, Freckles in 1928 and The Adventures of Blue Hardy for Pix magazine in 1938.

He was a foundation member of the Black and White Artists' Club and its first secretary.

In 1944 Unk was accredited as an official war artist and saw active service with the RAAF and Royal Navy in New Guinea, the Pacific and Japan.

He was also a highly regarded painter in watercolours.

From the late 1960s White drew many of the architectural drawings in the Rigby Sketchbook series.

Publications
Unk White's Laugh Parade Frank Johnson, Sydney 1940
Unk White's Second Laugh Parade Frank Johnson, Sydney 1940
Unk White's Giggles Pinnacle Press, Sydney 1943

Illustrations for Rigby Sketchbook Series (pub. Adelaide) inc.:
The Rocks, Sydney by Olaf Ruhen, 1966
Sydney Harbour Sketchbook by R. Sriber, 1968
Auckland Sketchbook by M. H. Holcroft, 1969
Norfolk Island Sketchbook by R. Sriber, 1969
New England Sketchbook by Peter Newell, 1970
Ballarat and Western Goldfields Sketchbook by John Bechervaise, 1970
Bendigo and Eastern Goldfields Sketchbook by John Bechervaise, 1970
Hawkesbury River Sketchbook by Frank Cayley 1970
Blue Mountains Sketchbook by John Bechervaise, 1971
Nineteenth Century Sydney Sketchbook by Tess van Sommers, 1974
Paddington Sketchbook by Patricia Thompson 1975
Queensland Sketchbook by Peter Newell, 1976
Historic Sydney Sketchbook by Olaf Ruhen, Cedric Emanuel, Patricia Thompson, 1977

References

Australian cartoonists
Australian comics artists
1900 births
1986 deaths
Australian war artists